Tenacibaculum aiptasiae is a Gram-negative, aerobic and rod-shaped bacterium from the genus of Tenacibaculum which has been isolated from the sea anemone (Aiptasia pulchella).

References

External links
Type strain of Tenacibaculum aiptasiae at BacDive -  the Bacterial Diversity Metadatabase

Flavobacteria
Bacteria described in 2008